Christian Jules LeBlanc (born August 25, 1958) is an American actor, best known for his role as Michael Baldwin on The Young and the Restless.

Career
LeBlanc currently plays Michael Baldwin on The Young and the Restless. He was born in Fort Bragg, North Carolina, and first played the role from 1991 to 1993, and then resumed the role in 1997. He has been nominated for a Daytime Emmy Award for the role eight times, and won for Outstanding Lead Actor in  a Drama Series award in 2005, 2007, and 2009. He previously starred on another soap opera, As the World Turns, playing Kirk McColl from June 2, 1983, until the summer of 1985.  In 1988, LeBlanc played a police officer in the NBC police drama In the Heat of the Night, a TV version of the acclaimed movie.  LeBlanc was featured in eight episodes.  Christian appeared on As The World Turns again as his Y&R character Michael Baldwin on April 4 and 5 of 2005, when the character was crossed over to assist Jack and Carly Snyder in a custody suit.

He also made a guest appearance on the Showtime late-night cable TV series Red Shoe Diaries, and reprised the role for a video movie.

LeBlanc also appeared alongside his The Young and the Restless wife Tracey E. Bregman in the video for I Keep On Loving You by Reba McEntire in 2010.

On May 20, 2005, June 15, 2007, and August 30, 2009, LeBlanc won the Daytime Emmy for "Outstanding Lead Actor" for his role on Y&R. He was previously nominated for "Outstanding Supporting Actor in a Drama Series" in 1999, 2000, 2003 and 2004.

Personal life 

On June 20, 2021, he revealed on Maurice Benard's podcast State of Mind that he is gay and has been married to his husband for 28 years.

Filmography

Awards and nominations

Notes
Christian LeBlanc is related to television actor Matt LeBlanc, who played Joey Tribbiani on the sitcom Friends. 
Christian LeBlanc appears in the video clip "I Keep On Loving You" by Reba McEntire.

References

External links

1958 births
Living people
Male actors from New Orleans
20th-century American male actors
21st-century American male actors
American male television actors
American male soap opera actors
Daytime Emmy Award winners
Daytime Emmy Award for Outstanding Lead Actor in a Drama Series winners
American gay actors
LGBT people from North Carolina
People from Fort Bragg, North Carolina
Tulane University alumni
21st-century LGBT people